The Krays are an American street punk band from Brooklyn, New York, who formed in 1994. John writes all the lyrics.

The Krays played one of the last shows at CBGB in New York City. John was a member of The Devotchkas, NY Rel-X, and Roger Miret and the Disasters, and also played bass for The Casualties for a couple years.

Discography
1998: Inside Warfare
2000: A Battle for the Truth
2002: A Time for Action (TKO Records)
2011: Sangre

References

External links
The Krays GeoCities page
The Krays on Myspace

Musical groups from Brooklyn
Punk rock groups from New York (state)
Street punk groups